The Penza Cup is a professional tennis tournament played on outdoor hard courts. It is currently part of the ATP Challenger Tour. It is held annually in Penza, Russia, since 2006.

Past finals

Singles

Doubles

External links
ITF Search

 
ATP Challenger Tour
Hard court tennis tournaments
Tennis tournaments in Russia
Sport in Penza